The Green Bridge, on the outskirts of Las Cruces, New Mexico in Dona Ana County, New Mexico, was built in 1943.  It was listed on the National Register of Historic Places in 2008.

It is a single-span Pratt through truss bridge built by the Midland Bridge Co.  The bridge has pinned connections that tie together seven 19-foot panel sections.

It currently is on the property of the New Mexico Farm and Ranch Heritage Museum, at 4100 Dripping Springs Rd., just outside Las Cruces.  It spans the Tortugas Arroyo, a dry wash.  It originally was the middle one of a three-span bridge over the Pecos River, which was built in 1902.  That location was in Chaves County.  It was moved in 1943 to bring a small county road over the Rio Hondo, near the village of Picacho in Lincoln County.  It was removed from service in 1989 by construction of a bypass.  It was eventually donated to the New Mexico Farm and Ranch Heritage Museum, which moved it to its present location in 2007.

In its previous locations, it has also been known as the Rio Hondo Bridge at Picacho, as Bridge 3452, and as Pecos River Bridge.

References

External links

Bridges in New Mexico
Pratt truss bridges
National Register of Historic Places in Doña Ana County, New Mexico
Buildings and structures completed in 1943